In mathematics, the matrix exponential is a matrix function on square matrices analogous to the ordinary exponential function. It is used to solve systems of linear differential equations. In the theory of Lie groups, the matrix exponential gives the exponential map between a matrix Lie algebra and the corresponding Lie group.

Let   be an  real or complex matrix.

Properties

Elementary properties 
Let  and   be  complex matrices and let  and  be arbitrary complex numbers. The matrix exponential satisfies the following properties.

We begin with the properties that are immediate consequences of the definition as a power series:
 
 If  is invertible then 

The next key result is this one:
 If  then .

The proof of this identity is the same as the standard power-series argument for the corresponding identity for the exponential of real numbers. It is important to note that this identity typically does not hold if  and  do not commute (see Golden-Thompson inequality below).

Consequences of the preceding identity are the following:
 
 

Using the above results, we can easily verify the following claims. If  is symmetric then  is also symmetric, and if  is skew-symmetric then  is orthogonal. If  is Hermitian then  is also Hermitian, and if  is skew-Hermitian then  is unitary.

Finally, a Laplace transform of matrix exponentials amounts to the resolvent,

Linear differential equation systems 

One of the reasons for the importance of the matrix exponential is that it can be used to solve systems of linear ordinary differential equations. The solution of

where  is a constant matrix, is given by

The matrix exponential can also be used to solve the inhomogeneous equation

See the section on applications below for examples.

There is no closed-form solution for differential equations of the form

where  is not constant, but the Magnus series gives the solution as an infinite sum.

The determinant of the matrix exponential 
By Jacobi's formula, for any complex square matrix the following trace identity holds:

In addition to providing a computational tool, this formula demonstrates that a matrix exponential is always an invertible matrix. This follows from the fact that the right hand side of the above equation is always non-zero, and so , which implies that  must be invertible.

In the real-valued case, the formula also exhibits the map

to not be surjective, in contrast to the complex case mentioned earlier. This follows from the fact that, for real-valued matrices, the right-hand side of the formula is always positive, while there exist invertible matrices with a negative determinant.

Real symmetric matrices 

The matrix exponential of a real symmetric matrix is positive definite. Let  be an  real symmetric matrix and  a column vector. Using the elementary properties of the matrix exponential and of symmetric matrices, we have:

Hence  is positive definite.

The exponential of sums 

For any real numbers (scalars)  and  we know that the exponential function satisfies . The same is true for commuting matrices.  If matrices  and  commute (meaning that ), then,

However, for matrices that do not commute the above equality does not necessarily hold.

The Lie product formula 
Even if  and  do not commute, the exponential  can be computed by the Lie product formula

Using a large finite  to approximate the above is basis of the Suzuki-Trotter expansion, often used in numerical time evolution.

The Baker–Campbell–Hausdorff formula 

If  and  commute, then all the commutators are zero and we have simply .

Inequalities for exponentials of Hermitian matrices 

For Hermitian matrices there is a notable theorem related to the trace of matrix exponentials.

There is no requirement of commutativity. However, Lieb proved that it can be generalized to three matrices if we modify the expression as follows

The exponential map 
The exponential of a matrix is always an invertible matrix. This is analogous to the fact that the exponential of a complex number is always nonzero. The matrix exponential then gives us a map

from the space of all n×n matrices to the general linear group of degree , i.e. the group of all n×n invertible matrices. In fact, this map is surjective which means that every invertible matrix can be written as the exponential of some other matrix (for this, it is essential to consider the field C of complex numbers and not R).

where  denotes an arbitrary matrix norm.

The map

In fact, this gives a one-parameter subgroup of the general linear group since

The derivative of this curve (or tangent vector) at a point t is given by

More generally, for a generic -dependent exponent,

Taking the above expression  outside the integral sign and expanding the integrand with the help of the Hadamard lemma one can obtain the following useful expression for the derivative of the matrix exponent,

The coefficients in the expression above are different from what appears in the exponential. For a closed form, see derivative of the exponential map.

Directional derivatives when restricted to Hermitian matrices 

Let  be a  Hermitian matrix with distinct eigenvalues.

where , the operator  denotes the Hadamard product, and, for all , the matrix  is defined as

where the matrix-valued function  is defined, for all , as

with

Computing the matrix exponential 

Finding reliable and accurate methods to compute the matrix exponential is difficult, and this is still a topic of considerable current research in mathematics and numerical analysis. Matlab, GNU Octave, and SciPy all use the Padé approximant. In this section, we discuss methods that are applicable in principle to any matrix, and which can be carried out explicitly for small matrices. Subsequent sections describe methods suitable for numerical evaluation on large matrices.

Diagonalizable case 

If a matrix is diagonal:

then its exponential can be obtained by exponentiating each entry on the main diagonal:

This result also allows one to exponentiate diagonalizable matrices. If

Application of Sylvester's formula yields the same result.  (To see this, note that addition and multiplication, hence also exponentiation, of diagonal matrices is equivalent to element-wise addition and multiplication, and hence exponentiation; in particular, the "one-dimensional" exponentiation is felt element-wise for the diagonal case.)

Example : Diagonalizable
For example, the matrix

can be diagonalized as

Thus,

Nilpotent case 
A matrix  is nilpotent if  for some integer q. In this case, the matrix exponential  can be computed directly from the series expansion, as the series terminates after a finite number of terms:

Since the series has a finite number of steps, it is a matrix polynomial, which can be computed efficiently.

General case

Using the Jordan–Chevalley decomposition 
By the Jordan–Chevalley decomposition, any  matrix X with complex entries can be expressed as

where
 A is diagonalizable
 N is nilpotent
 A commutes with N

This means that we can compute the exponential of X by reducing to the previous two cases:

Note that we need the commutativity of A and N for the last step to work.

Using the Jordan canonical form 
Then

Also, since

Therefore, we need only know how to compute the matrix exponential of a Jordan block. But each Jordan block is of the form

where  is a special nilpotent matrix.

Projection case 
If  is a projection matrix, its matrix exponential is:

Rotation case 
For a simple rotation in which the perpendicular unit vectors  and  specify a plane, the rotation matrix  can be expressed in terms of a similar exponential function involving a generator  and angle .

reduces to the standard matrix for a plane rotation.

The matrix  projects a vector onto the -plane and the rotation only affects this part of the vector.

Evaluation by Laurent series 
By virtue of the Cayley–Hamilton theorem the matrix exponential is expressible as a polynomial of order −1.

is entire, then

Such a polynomial  can be found as follows−see Sylvester's formula.

Example: Consider the case of an arbitrary 2×2 matrix,

The exponential matrix , by virtue of the Cayley–Hamilton theorem, must be of the form

Then we have

hence

if ; while, if ,

so that

Defining

we have

where  is 0 if , and  if .

Thus,

Thus, as indicated above, the matrix  having decomposed into the sum of two mutually commuting pieces, the traceful piece and the traceless piece,

the matrix exponential reduces to a plain product of the exponentials of the two respective pieces. This is a formula often used in physics, as it amounts to the analog of Euler's formula for Pauli spin matrices, that is rotations of the doublet representation of the group SU(2).

The polynomial  can also be given the following "interpolation" characterization. We further assume that  is a diagonalizable matrix.

At the other extreme, if , then

Evaluation by implementation of Sylvester's formula 
A practical, expedited computation of the above reduces to the following rapid steps.

But this simple procedure also works for defective matrices, in a generalization due to Buchheim. This is illustrated here for a 4×4 example of a matrix which is not diagonalizable, and the s are not projection matrices.

Consider

Multiply each exponentiated eigenvalue by the corresponding undetermined coefficient matrix .

(If one eigenvalue had a multiplicity of three, then there would be the three terms: . By contrast, when all eigenvalues are distinct, the s are just the Frobenius covariants, and solving for them as below just amounts to the inversion of the Vandermonde matrix of these 4 eigenvalues.)

Sum all such terms, here four such,

and again,

and once more,

(In the general case, −1 derivatives need be taken.)

Setting  = 0 in these four equations, the four coefficient matrices s may now be solved for,

to yield

Substituting with the value for  yields the coefficient matrices

so the final answer is

The procedure is much shorter than Putzer's algorithm sometimes utilized in such cases.

Illustrations 

Suppose that we want to compute the exponential of

Its Jordan form is

where the matrix P is given by

Let us first calculate exp(J). We have

The exponential of a 1×1 matrix is just the exponential of the one entry of the matrix, so . The exponential of J2(16) can be calculated by the formula  mentioned above; this yields

Therefore, the exponential of the original matrix  is

Applications

Linear differential equations 

The matrix exponential has applications to systems of linear differential equations.  (See also matrix differential equation.)  Recall from earlier in this article that a homogeneous differential equation of the form

has solution .

If we consider the vector

we can express a system of inhomogeneous coupled linear differential equations as

The second step is possible due to the fact that, if , then .

Notice that while  is a matrix, given that it is a matrix exponential, we can say that . In other words, .

Example (homogeneous) 
Consider the system

The associated defective matrix is

The matrix exponential is

so that the general solution of the homogeneous system is

amounting to

Example (inhomogeneous) 
Consider now the inhomogeneous system

We again have

and

From before, we already have the general solution to the homogeneous equation. Since the sum of the homogeneous and particular solutions give the general solution to the inhomogeneous problem, we now only need find the particular solution.

We have, by above,

which could be further simplified to get the requisite particular solution determined through variation of parameters.
Note c = yp(0). For more rigor, see the following generalization.

Inhomogeneous case generalization:  variation of parameters 
For the inhomogeneous case, we can use integrating factors (a method akin to variation of parameters). We seek a particular solution of the form ,

For  to be a solution,

Thus,

where  is determined by the initial conditions of the problem.

More precisely, consider the equation

with the initial condition , where
  is a continuous function from some open interval  to ℂn,

Left-multiplying the above displayed equality by  yields

We claim that the solution to the equation

where the notation is as follows:
  is a monic polynomial of degree ,
  is a continuous complex valued function defined on some open interval ,
  is a complex number, and

To justify this claim, we transform our order  scalar equation into an order one vector equation by the usual reduction to a first order system. Our vector equation takes the form

We solve this equation as explained above, computing the matrix exponentials by the observation made in Subsection Evaluation by implementation of Sylvester's formula above.

In the case  = 2 we get the following statement. The solution to

is

Matrix-matrix exponentials 
The matrix exponential of another matrix (matrix-matrix exponential), is defined as

for any normal and non-singular  matrix , and any complex  matrix .

For matrix-matrix exponentials, there is a distinction between the left exponential  and the right exponential , because the multiplication operator for matrix-to-matrix is not commutative. Moreover,
 If  is normal and non-singular, then  and  have the same set of eigenvalues.

See also 

 Matrix function
 Matrix logarithm
 C0-semigroup
 Exponential function
 Exponential map (Lie theory)
 Magnus expansion
 Derivative of the exponential map
 Vector flow
 Golden–Thompson inequality
 Phase-type distribution
 Lie product formula
 Baker–Campbell–Hausdorff formula
 Frobenius covariant
 Sylvester's formula
 Trigonometric functions of matrices

References 

 
 .
 .

External links 
 

Matrix theory
Lie groups
Exponentials